Rossmore is a small village and townland in County Tipperary in Ireland. It is in the civil parish of Clonoulty, barony of Kilnamanagh Lower. It is located in the electoral division (ED) of Clonoulty West. It is also half of the Clonoulty and Rossmore parish in the Roman Catholic Archdiocese of Cashel and Emly.

Geographic location 
Rossmore is administered by Tipperary County Council, and lies within the boundaries of Tipperary constituency for the purposes of Irish general elections.

Rossmore is almost equidistant from the three nearest towns. Cashel is 12 kilometres south-east, Thurles is 13 kilometres north-east, and Tipperary Town is 14 kilometres south-west. The nearest railway station is Thurles railway station, which has frequent and direct connections to Ireland's three largest cities: Dublin, Cork, and Limerick.

Rossmore may also refer to a slightly larger area which forms one half of the Clonoulty–Rossmore GAA club.
The usage of the term Rossmore in these instances encompasses a number of other townlands including Rossmore itself, plus Glenough, Turraheen, Knockbawn, Toragh, Doorish, Westonslot, Gorteenamoe, Drum, Drumwood, Tooreen, Coolanga, Clunedarby, Brockagh, Park, and Stouke.

Local facilities 
The village consists of a national school, a post office, a racquetball alley, silent orchard airsoft site, a Roman Catholic church, and a pub. Rossmore National School is a primary school which has subsumed two other schools in close proximity to it over the past three decades - Glenough National School, and Turraheen National School. The majority of children from the Rossmore area travel to Thurles or Cashel for second-level education. Bus services bring pupils to secondary schools in these towns.

Rossmore is primarily an agricultural area, with numerous dairy and beef farms. The Multeen River, a tributary of the River Suir flows by the village, passing beside Rossmore Community Hall, and continuing downstream under Rossmore Bridge.

The most popular team sport in the area is hurling, with hurlers from Rossmore having represented the Tipperary GAA hurling team at all age grades.

References

Parishes of the Roman Catholic Archdiocese of Cashel and Emly
Towns and villages in County Tipperary
Townlands of County Tipperary
Kilnamanagh Lower